Lariophagus distinguendus is a idiobiont ectoparasitoid hymenopteran in the family Pteromalidae, superfamily Chalcidoidea. It parasitizes small beetle larvae concealed in seeds, as well as prepupae and pupae in their cocoons. It is used for the biological control of several beetle pests of stored products, particularly in central Europe, where it is produced commercially and distributed by at least 11 companies.

Taxonomy 
Arnold Förster described this species in 1841 under the name Pteromalus distinguendus. In 1913, N. Kurdjumov moved it to the genus Lariophagus. While studying the types of Meraporus calandrae Howard and Meraporus utibilis Tucker, Hase in 1919 established their synonymy with Lariophagus distinguendus.

Description 
The female is 2 to 3 mm long, dark blue, basal part of abdomen green, wings white with yellow-brown veins. The male is 1.1 to 2 mm long.

Host species 
Its hosts include, but are not limited to:
Callosobruchus chinensis (adzuki bean beetle)
Callosobruchus maculatus (cowpea weevil)
Gibbium psylloides (hump beetle)
Ptinus tectus (Australian spider beetle)
Rhyzopertha dominica (lesser grain borer)
Sitophilus granarius (wheat weevil)
Sitophilus oryzae (rice weevil)
Stegobium paniceum (drugstore beetle)

References 

Pteromalidae